The black-tailed antenna ray (Plesiotrygon nana) is a species of freshwater stingray in the family Potamotrygonidae. It is native to the western Amazon basin in northeastern Peru, western Brazil (east to around the Purus mouth), southeastern Colombia, and possibly eastern Ecuador. It is found both in the mainstream of the Amazon and Putumayo Rivers and in smaller tributaries such as the Itaya and Pachitea Rivers. It is occasionally kept in aquariums and has been bred in captivity, but it is sensitive and the tail is easily damaged.

The black-tailed antenna ray is very long-tailed (tail length typically at least three times the disc width), similar to the only other member of the genus, the long-tailed river stingray (P. iwamae).

References

Potamotrygonidae
Freshwater fish of Brazil
Freshwater fish of Peru
Fish of the Amazon basin
Fish described in 2011